The women's 1500 metres race of the 2014–15 ISU Speed Skating World Cup 4, arranged in the Thialf arena in Heerenveen, Netherlands, was held on 14 December 2014.

Heather Richardson of the United States won, followed by Brittany Bowe of the United States in second place, and Marrit Leenstra of the Netherlands in third place. Ivanie Blondin of Canada won Division B.

Results
The race took place on Sunday, 14 December, with Division B scheduled in the morning session, at 09:00, and Division A scheduled in the afternoon session, at 14:00.

Division A

Division B

References

Women 1500
4